The Association of Zoos and Aquariums (AZA), originally the American Association of Zoological Parks and Aquariums, is an American 501(c)(3) 
nonprofit organization founded in 1924 and dedicated to the advancement of zoos and public aquariums in the areas of conservation, education, science, and recreation. AZA is headquartered in Silver Spring, Maryland, United States, and accredits zoos. There were 238 accredited facilities as of 2019, primarily in the US, and also a handful in eleven other countries.

History 
In October 1924 the American Association of Zoological Parks and Aquariums was formed as an affiliate of the American Institute of Park Executives. In 1966, the American Association of Zoological Parks and Aquariums became a professional branch affiliate of the newly formed National Recreation and Park Association, which absorbed the American Institute of Park Executives.

In the fall of 1971, the American Association of Zoological Parks and Aquariums membership voted to become an independent association. On January 19, 1972, it was chartered as the American Association of Zoological Parks and Aquariums with its executive office located in Wheeling, West Virginia, within the Oglebay Park Good Zoo. In 1994 the shorter name American Zoo and Aquarium Association (AZA) was adopted.

In early 2018 AZA acquired the Wildlife Trafficking Alliance to help grow public awareness about the purchase and sale of illegal wildlife products in the United States.

The Association of Zoos and Aquariums reported 195 million visitors to its 236 accredited member facilities in 2017.

Activities
The organization is active in institution accreditation, animal care initiatives, education and conservation programs, collaborative research and advocacy.

AZA serves as an accrediting body for zoos and aquariums and ensures accredited facilities meet higher standards of animal care than required by law. Institutions are evaluated every five years in order to ensure standards are met and to maintain accreditation. As of 2019 AZA had 238 accredited facilities in the US and eleven other countries: Canada, Mexico, Bermuda, The Bahamas, the Dominican Republic, Colombia, Argentina, Spain, Hong Kong, Singapore, and South Korea.

Approximately 800,000 animals representing 6,000 species are in the care of AZA-accredited facilities, including 1,000 threatened or endangered species. The association also facilitates both species survival plans and population management plans, which serve to sustainably manage genetically diverse captive populations of various animal species.

AZA holds a conference in September, one of the largest zoo and aquarium professionals' events in the USA.

AZA also manages the citizen science program FrogWatch USA.

Accreditation 
In the United States, any public animal exhibit must be licensed and inspected by the United States Department of Agriculture, United States Environmental Protection Agency, Drug Enforcement Administration, Occupational Safety and Health Administration, and others. Depending on the animals they exhibit, the activities of zoos are regulated by laws including the Endangered Species Act, the Animal Welfare Act, the Migratory Bird Treaty Act of 1918 and others.  Additionally, zoos in North America may choose to pursue accreditation by AZA. 

The American association has developed a definition for zoological gardens and aquariums as part of its accreditation standards: "A permanent cultural institution which owns and maintains captive wild animals that represent more than a token collection and, under the direction of a professional staff, provides its collection with appropriate care and exhibits them in an aesthetic manner to the public on a regularly scheduled basis. They shall further be defined as having as their primary business the exhibition, conservation and preservation of the earth's fauna in an educational and scientific manner."

To achieve accreditation, a zoo must pass an application and inspection process and meet or exceed AZA's standards for animal health and welfare, fundraising, zoo staffing, and involvement in global conservation efforts. Inspection is performed by three experts (typically one veterinarian, one expert in animal care, and one expert in zoo management and operations) and then reviewed by a panel of twelve experts before accreditation is awarded. This accreditation process is repeated once every five years.

AZA estimates that there are approximately 2,800 animal exhibits operating under USDA license as of 2019; fewer than 10% are accredited. Certification is possible for facilities that hold animals, but are not regularly open to the public.

Saving Animals From Extinction 
AZA's Saving Animals From Extinction (SAFE) program prioritizes collaboration between zoos and aquariums to support highly vulnerable species. SAFE builds on existing recovery plans to implement strategic conservation and public engagement activities. In 2017, AZA member zoos and aquariums invested $15.6 million towards SAFE program species.

The SAFE program signature species include the African lion, African vultures, Asian elephant, Atlantic Acropora coral, black-footed ferret, black rhinoceros, cheetah, eastern indigo snake, giraffe, gorilla, sea turtles, orangutan, radiated tortoise, red wolf, sea turtles, sharks and rays, vaquita, western pond turtle and whooping crane. There were more than 20 species or taxonomic groups included in the program as of 2019.

Annual Report on Conservation and Science 
The association has a computerized database called the Annual Report on Conservation and Science. This helps track AZA research projects worldwide.

AZA member zoos and aquariums contribute $220 million to conservation projects each year.  They participate in 115 reintroduction programs, including more than 40 programs for species listed as threatened or endangered under the Endangered Species Act.

In 2017, member institutions reported participating in field conservation projects benefiting over 860 species in 128 countries. AZA zoos and aquariums spent $25 million on research and published 170 books, book chapters, journal articles, conference proceeding papers, posters and theses or dissertations. Animal care, health and welfare, followed by species and habitat conservation, describe 68% of the AZA community's research.

List of member zoos and aquariums 
To be a member, a facility must either be accredited or certified.

Accredited facilities 
Accredited facilities maintain a professional staff and appropriate animal care, and are open to the public on a predictable basis. The following list is from 2013.

Certified related facilities 
Certified facilities maintain a professional staff and appropriate animal care, but are not open to the public on a predictable basis.

Former members

Notable people
 

Melanie R. Bond, biologist, primate scientist and author

See also
 List of zoo associations
 World Association of Zoos and Aquariums

References

External links 
 

Zoo associations
Trade associations based in the United States
 
Organizations established in 1924
1924 establishments in the United States
Silver Spring, Maryland